Henrietta Mary Batson née Blackman (1859–1943) was an English writer whose interest in the countryside and rural people was an important theme in her novels and much of her non-fiction. She often published as Mrs. Stephen Batson, or sometimes as H.M. Batson.

Life

Born in Hamilton, Ontario to the Rev. Thomas John Mark Willoughby Blackman and Ann Blackman née Gunn in 1859, Batson was living in England by 1871. She stayed there for the rest of her life, and her writing is rooted in English settings and issues. She married in 1879 at Monewden where her father was curate-in-charge,  and where she had been an instructor in the night school and the choir. Her husband was the Rev. Alfred Stephen Batson, rector of Welford in Berkshire. Their daughter Mary Stephanie was born the year after their wedding but died when a few weeks old. They lived in the rectory for more than a decade but were then able to move to a smaller, more suitable house.

Batson's writing began to be published in the early 1890s. Her earlier novels seemed to have something in common with Thomas Hardy’s, including their “Wessex” setting and exploration of the tragic side of life.  She emphasised rural themes and settings in all her novels. She wrote about "rustic" characters and in real life took a sympathetic interest in “less fortunate” country people. Reviewers were generally polite about her novels and gave the impression that she had "ability and vision" and deserved to be read. For example, a review of her novel The Gay Paradines said "...with the small reservations mentioned we can heartily recommend the story to all our readers; the standard is high, and the tone good in every way." However, she got only limited attention from the literary world.

Batson was interested in gardening, folk customs, local history, genealogy and religious topics. She published non-fiction works on most of these subjects and also made scrapbooks, wrote diaries and created a multi-volume manuscript account of family history, which she gave to the London Society of Genealogists.

Batson's husband died in 1908. Her last published work came out in 1910, though she went on compiling family genealogy for several years after that. In the 1911 census she described herself as a writer. At this time her niece Margery May Hodgson was part of the household, and they were also living together in 1939. When Henrietta Batson died at Swyre in Dorset in 1943, probate was granted to Hodgson.

Selected works

Fiction
 Dark: a Tale of the Down Country, London: Smith, Elder, 1892
 Such a Lord is Love: A woman's heart tragedy, London,  A.D. Innes & Co., 1893
 Adam the Gardener, London : Hurst and Blackett, 1894
 The Earth Children, London : Hutchinson & Co., 1897
 The Gay Paradines, London, Stanley, Paul and Co.1909
 A Splendid Heritage, London, Stanley, Paul and Co.1910

Non-fiction
 Hodge at home, in the Nineteenth Century magazine, vol. 31, 1892
 Terrier and inventory of church possessions in the parish of Welford, Berks., Newbury, 1892
 The rule of the laywoman, in the Nineteenth Century magazine, vol. 39, Jan. 1896
 Town and country labourers: (answers to "The cry of the villages" by A. Jessopp), with P. Wyndham, in the Nineteenth Century magazine, vol. 46, 1899.
 The Ruba'iyat of Omar Khayyam , translated by Edward Fitzgerald; with a commentary by H.M. Batson and a biographical introduction by E.D. Ross, London : Methuen and co. 1900
 A concise handbook of garden flowers, London: Methuen 1903 
 A book of the country and the garden, London: Methuen 1903
 The summer garden of pleasure, London: Methuen 1908

Other
 A history of the Blackman and allied families in Sussex, England, by Henrietta Blackman Batson (Mrs. Alfred Stephen Batson); with addenda, edited, revised, with new material by Marion Wincote Elliott, Los Altos, Calif. 1994
 Index of Mrs Batson's scrapbooks, compiled by Alan W. Garvey, Newbury: Wickham cum Welford History Association c2003

References

1859 births
1943 deaths
19th-century English writers
19th-century British women writers
19th-century British writers
20th-century English writers
20th-century British women writers
Pseudonymous women writers
Writers from Hamilton, Ontario
19th-century pseudonymous writers
20th-century pseudonymous writers